Yerits Mankants Monastery is a 17th-century Armenian monastery de facto in the Martakert Province of the breakaway Republic of Artsakh, de jure in the Tartar District of Azerbaijan. The monastery is located in the mountains to the west of Maghavuz, southwest of Tonashen, and close to the fortress of Jraberd.

History 
It is the most notable example of monasteries built during the late Middle Ages in Nagorno-Karabakh, after an interruption in church building from the 14th to 16th centuries. Yerits Mankants monastery was built around 1691 in the historical county of Jraberd. The monastery was established by the feudal family of Melik-Israelians, Lords of Jraberd, with an apparent purpose to rival the Holy See of Gandzasar and its hereditary patrons the Hasan-Jalalians, Lords of Khachen.

Gallery

See also 
 Culture of Artsakh

References

External links 

 Yerits Mankants Monastery on Armeniapedia.org
 History of the Art and Architecture of Artsakh

Armenian culture
Armenian buildings in Azerbaijan
Armenian Apostolic Church
Armenian Apostolic churches
Armenian Apostolic monasteries
Armenian Apostolic monasteries in Azerbaijan
Christian monasteries in the Republic of Artsakh
Oriental Orthodox congregations established in the 17th century
Christian monasteries established in the 17th century
Martakert Province